William Hammerstein (September 26, 1875 – June 10, 1914) was an American theater manager. He ran the Victoria Theatre on what became Times Square, Manhattan, presenting very popular vaudeville shows with a wide variety of acts. He was known for "freak acts", where celebrities or people notorious for scandals appeared on stage. Hammerstein's Victoria Theatre became the most successful in New York.

Early years

William Hammerstein was born in New York City on September 26, 1875, son of Oscar Hammerstein, the theater impresario, and his first wife, née Rose Blau.
He started work as a press agent, then built a vaudeville theatre on 110th Street, Manhattan, called Little Coney Island. 
He also managed burlesque shows.
Willie Hammerstein managed his father's Olympia Theater, which opened in 1895.
In November 1896 Willie Hammerstein brought the Cherry Sisters to the Olympia roof garden. The sisters put on a terrible act where they sang sentimental, dialect or patriotic songs. One of them played the piano and another banged a drum. Willie knew how bad they were. He provided a net that protected them when the audience, as expected, started throwing produce and garbage at the stage. The word spread, and the sisters became a big draw.

Oscar Hammerstein went bankrupt in 1898. The Olympia theater was sold in an auction. Hammerstein managed to raise enough money to build the Victoria Theatre, which opened as a legitimate theater on March 3, 1899. On June 26, 1899, he opened a partially enclosed roof garden theater, the Venetian Terrace Garden, with an outdoor promenade that was attached to the roof garden of Hammerstein's Theatre Republic in 1900. Hammerstein enlarged the roof garden theater and reopened it in May 1901 as the Paradise Roof Garden.

Victoria Theatre

In February 1904 Willie Hammerstein took over management of his father's Victoria Theatre.
He was talented at promoting his shows, and was skilled at finding and booking profitable acts.
The Victoria had been staging variety acts, plays and musicals. 
Willie Hammerstein started putting on popular low-brow vaudeville shows at low prices. He signed up stars and unknown new performers, celebrities of all types, physical freaks, illusionists and risqué exotic dancers. The highly varied programs drew large and often noisy audiences.

Hammerstein ran the only vaudeville theater in Times Square, and had no other theatres. 
He was able to develop shows uniquely fitted to his local audience.
The crowd at the Victoria like the rather jaded and cynical atmosphere, the stage slang and black humor.
Acts could afford to include more sexual innuendo than in other houses.
To keep costs and prices down, a typical Hammerstein bill would feature a few well-paid stars and a large number of lower-priced novelty acts.

Hammerstein made the Victoria the most popular venue for vaudeville in New York.
The Victoria was a grand building, and played some high-quality acts.
As of 1905 the theater owners who booked through the William Morris Agency seemed likely to become dominant in the vaudeville industry. They included Hammerstein, Frederick Freeman Proctor, Timothy Sullivan and Percy G. Williams.
Later the Keith-Albee circuit booking office gave Hammerstein a monopoly on big-time vaudeville in Times Square.

Willie's father was much more interested in grand opera, and in 1906 opened the Manhattan Opera House.
Revenue from the Victoria kept the opera house running.
At one point Oscar Hammerstein, always short of money, moved to sell the Victoria to the Shubert family.
Willie and his brother Arthur, who produced shows, blocked the attempt.
In March 1913 Keith and Albee paid Oscar Hamilton a reported $225,000 to give up his monopoly.
They opened the Palace Theatre at 47th Street and 7th Avenue, advertising "refined glamour" and featuring the biggest stars of vaudeville. 
Acts became harder to book, since performers did not want to be connected with a rival of the powerful Keith's circuit.

Acts
Performers enjoyed playing the Victoria. Buster Keaton thought it was the greatest of the vaudeville houses.
Hammerstein asked performers back many times if he liked them, as with the British comedian Harry Tate.
In June 1905 Willie Hammerstein signed up Will Rogers to perform in the Victoria for afternoon matinees and in the Paradise Roof Garden in the evenings.
The young Mae West played eleven one-week engagements in 1912 and 1913, a good fit with the audience through her suggestion of notoriety.
Hammerstein often booked acts from Europe, who sometimes made up half the show.
He introduced the dancers Gertrude Hoffmann and Constance Stewart-Richardson to the vaudeville stage.
A review in the New York Dramatic Mirror of August 12, 1905, gives a sense of the shows:

Willie Hammerstein became known for his "freak acts". Typically these featured people who had scandalized the public and gained notoriety. Members of love triangles involving murders or suicides were popular, if one of their members was free to appear and give the public the titillating details.
Evelyn Nesbit was an example.
In 1911 Irving Berlin was featured at the Victoria, billed as "The Composer of a Hundred Hits", and performed a number of his songs including That Mysterious Rag. Berlin was hired more as a celebrity songwriter than for his ability to sing, but was a hit with the audience anyway.

Other types of human curiosity were "Shekla, Court Magician to the Shah of Persia" and "Madamoiselle Fatima, Escaped Harem Dancer: ... She has a distinctive Turkish personality and dances with original movements all her own, accompanied by her two Eunuch Servants."
Hammerstein also put on novelties like Don the Talking Dog.
Sports celebrities like boxer James J. Corbett and baseball pitcher Rube Marquard also drew audiences.

Family and legacy

Hammerstein was unusual in making a sharp separation between his work in the theater, which he loved, and his home life.
He would not pose for a photograph, and told his press agents not to use his name in publicity.
Hammerstein married Alice Nimmo in 1893, and they had two sons, Oscar and Reginald. They lived at 315 Central Park West.
His wife died in 1910 and he married her sister, Annie Nimmo.
He never took part in Broadway night life, and he did not want his two sons to get involved in theater.
However, Oscar Hammerstein II became famous as a lyricist and musical comedy writer.

Willie Hammerstein suffered from a disease of the kidneys, and died in New York on June 10, 1914.
He was aged 38.
He had made the Victoria his own. His brother, Arthur, took over management but was unable to recapture the spirit.
The theater soon had to be closed.
The Victoria Theatre was pulled down two years after Willie Hammerstein died, and the Rialto was built in its place, the first movie palace in Times Square.

References

Notes

Citations

Sources

1875 births
1914 deaths
American theatre managers and producers
American people of German-Jewish descent
Hammerstein family (show business)
19th-century American businesspeople
Special Tony Award recipients
Deaths from kidney disease